The Butterfly on the Wheel is a lost 1915 American silent drama film directed by Maurice Tourneur and starring Holbrook Blinn, Vivian Martin and George Relph.

Plot

Cast
 Holbrook Blinn as Mr. Admaston  
 Vivian Martin as Peggy Admaston  
 George Relph as Collingwood  
 June Elvidge as Lady Attwill  
 Johnny Hines

References

Bibliography
 Waldman, Harry. Maurice Tourneur: The Life and Films. McFarland, 2001.

External links

1915 films
1915 drama films
Silent American drama films
Films directed by Maurice Tourneur
American silent feature films
1910s English-language films
American black-and-white films
Lost American films
World Film Company films
Films shot in Fort Lee, New Jersey
1915 lost films
Lost drama films
1910s American films